Ider may refer to:

Places
 Ider, Iran (disambiguation), places in Iran
 Ider, Zavkhan, a sum and small town in Mongolia
 Ider, Alabama, United States

Music
 Ider (band), an English singer-songwriter duo

Organizations
 Human Values and Mental Health Foundation (İnsani Değerler ve Ruh Sağlığı Vakfı; İDER), Turkey